Reuben Benoni Showalter (June 3, 1842 – January 27, 1912) was a member of the Wisconsin State Assembly.

Biography
Showalter was born on June 3, 1842 in Smithfield, Pennsylvania. He would later reside in Lancaster, Wisconsin, Richland County, Wisconsin and Beetown, Wisconsin. During the American Civil War, he served with the 2nd Regiment Wisconsin Volunteer Cavalry of the Union Army. Showalter later became a bank president. He died on January 27, 1912.

Political career
Showalter was elected to the Assembly in 1886 and 1888. Other positions he held include alderman and Mayor of Lancaster and Chairman Grant County, Wisconsin board of supervisors. He was a Republican.

References

External links
Find A Grave

People from Fayette County, Pennsylvania
People from Lancaster, Wisconsin
People from Richland County, Wisconsin
Republican Party members of the Wisconsin State Assembly
Mayors of places in Wisconsin
Wisconsin city council members
County supervisors in Wisconsin
People of Wisconsin in the American Civil War
Union Army soldiers
American bank presidents
1842 births
1912 deaths
Burials in Wisconsin
People from Beetown, Wisconsin
19th-century American businesspeople